The Missionary Position is an American rock band that creates a mix of hard rock, blues and funk influences into their music. The band is from Seattle, Washington in the United States.

History
Following the demise of Angell's band Post Stardom Depression, he formed The Missionary Position with an old friend and fellow Seattle musician, Benjamin Anderson. When Jeff Angell and Benjamin Anderson began playing a Thursday night residency at a club in Seattle, Washington, they hadn't yet settled on a name. Those Thursday lounge nights were billed as The Missionary Position, and Angell said people thought that was the band's name. So rather than fight it, Angell and Anderson embraced what the steadily growing number of Thursday night fans already had—they were now in The Missionary Position.

In 2009 they recorded Diamonds In A Dead Sky and released it on the band's label The Boredom Killing Business. The band supported the release by touring nationally.

In 2012 The Missionary Position released their second album titled Consequences.

The Missionary Position are currently on hiatus recording and performing music. In 2012 members Jeff Angell and Benjamin Anderson switched focus to their new band Walking Papers.

Discography

References

The Missionary Position Bio page
The Missionary Position article northwest music scene.com
credits at Allmusic.com
WalkingPapers.us

Musical groups from Seattle
Musical groups established in 2009
Hard rock musical groups from Washington (state)